Horrible Histories with Stephen Fry is the name given to the six-part re-version of the hit children's sketch comedy Horrible Histories for an adult audience. Broadcast in a Sunday-night time slot from 19 June 2011 to 31 July 2011 on BBC One, the programme features a compilation of sketches from the first two series of Horrible Histories, as chosen by that show's producers. As a concession to the more mature audience, comedian and QI presenter Stephen Fry replaced puppet Rattus Rattus as host, presenting "added insight and historical nuggets".

Producer Caroline Norris, who also served as Horrible Histories''' series producer, described the recut as an experiment in "what we would do if [Horrible Histories] was in primetime". From a production standpoint, all that was needed was to choose the sketches that seemed most suitable for an adult audience and then to write appropriate linking material for Fry.

 Episodes 

Critical reception and controversy

From a creative standpoint the project was generally warmly received, especially given the original series' cross-demographic profile had recently been heightened by its first British Comedy Award win for Best Sketch Comedy.

However, the choice of a children's series for an adult-oriented channel drew some criticism as to whether the same educational methods were suited to an older demographic. History Today editor Paul Lay called the idea "frightening". Historian and Labour Party MP Tristram Hunt, while admitting that he had not yet actually seen the programme, voiced his concerns that the show's content was not "challenging and stimulating" enough for the BBC, adding that "For children, Horrible Histories'' is an exciting aid to engage with the guts and gore of the past, but there are more sophisticated, populist ways of getting people involved in history than this. I'm in favour of populism, but there has to be a bit of depth to it."

References

External links
 

Episode list using the default LineColor
2010s British comedy television series
2011 British television series debuts
British television shows based on children's books
BBC children's television shows
BBC television comedy
Horrible Histories